Kelvin Opoku Abrefa (born 9 December 2003) is a professional footballer who plays as a centre-back for Reading. Born in Italy, he is a youth international for Ghana.

Club career
Abrefa made his professional debut for Reading, coming on in the 87th minute for Tom Holmes in a 3-2 EFL Championship loss to Coventry City on 12 February 2022.
On 25 March 2022, Abrefa signed his first professional contract with Reading on a contract until the summer of 2024. He scored his first goal for the club on 7 January, 2023 in a FA Cup match against Watford when his looping cross from the right wing flew over the opposing goalkeeper and went in off the far post.

International career
Born in Italy to Ghanaian parents and growing up in England, Abrefa was eligible to represent all three at international level. Abrefa was called up to the Ghana U20 team for the first time in May 2022, for the 2022 Maurice Revello Tournament. Abrefa went on to make his debut for them on 2 June 2022 against Indonesia U19.

Personal life
Abrefa was born in Italy to Ghanaian parents, and moved to England at a young age.

Career statistics

Club

References

External links
 

2003 births
Living people
Citizens of Ghana through descent
Ghanaian footballers
Ghana youth international footballers
Italian footballers
English footballers
Italian people of Ghanaian descent
Italian sportspeople of African descent
English sportspeople of Ghanaian descent
Italian emigrants to the United Kingdom
Association football defenders
Reading F.C. players
English Football League players